A battery tester is an electronic device intended for testing the state of an electric battery, going from a simple device for testing the charge actually present in the cells and/or its voltage output, to a more comprehensive testing of the battery's condition, namely its capacity for accumulating charge and any possible flaws affecting the battery's performance and security.

Simple battery testers 
The most simple battery tester is a DC ammeter, that indicates the battery's charge rate.
DC voltmeters can be used to estimate the charge rate of a battery, provided that its nominal voltage is known.

Integrated battery testers 
There are many types of integrated battery testers, each one corresponding to a specific condition testing procedure, according to the type of battery being tested, such as the “421” test for lead-acid vehicle batteries. Their common principle is based on the empirical fact that after having applied a given current for a given number of seconds to the battery, the resulting voltage output is related to the battery's overall condition, when compared to a healthy battery's output.

References

External links 

Power Equipment Engine Technology  By Edward Abdo
Automotive Technology: A Systems Approach By Jack Erjavec
Wharton on Dynamic Competitive Strategy edited by George S. Day, David J. Reibstein
The Entrepreneurial Mindset By Rita Gunther McGrath, Ian C. MacMillan Harvard Business Press, 2000

Electrical equipment
Battery (electricity)